The CONMEBOL South American Under-20 Beach Soccer Championship (named natively in Spanish as the Sudamericano Sub-20 Futbol Playa) is a biennial international youth beach soccer tournament contested between the national teams of men aged under 20 years of the 10 members of CONMEBOL. It is the under-20s version of the Copa América de Beach Soccer and beach soccer's version of the better known South American Youth Football Championship in its parent sport, association football.

The tournament is organized by the governing body for football in South America, CONMEBOL, who commissioned the event in 2015 as part of a declaration of commitment to develop beach soccer on the continent which involved establishing new tournaments, including an under-20s championship. The first edition subsequently took place in 2017.

Argentina are the current champions.

Results

Performance

Successful nations

Overall standings
As of 2019

Key:
Appearances App / Won in Normal Time W = 3 Points / Won in Extra Time W+ = 2 Points / Won in Penalty shoot-out WP = 1 Point / Lost L = 0 Points

Appearances & performance timeline 
Key

 – Champions
 – Runners-up
 – Third place
 – Fourth place

5th–10th — Fifth to tenth place
 — Did not participate
 – Hosts
Apps — Total appearances

See also
South American Under-20 Futsal Championship

References

External links
CONMEBOL, official website
Beach Soccer Worldwide, official website

 
Beach soccer competitions
CONMEBOL competitions
Biennial sporting events
Recurring sporting events established in 2017
South American youth sports competitions